Eleazar ha-Kappar (or אליעזר בן הקפר , read as Eliezer ben ha-Kappar, or אלעזר בן הקפר, read as Eleazar ha-Kappar) was a Jewish rabbi of the fifth and last generation of the Tannaim era. He was a colleague of Judah haNasi, and was in the company of him occasionally. He spent most of his life at ancient Katzrin. He was the father of Bar Kappara, who is sometimes cited by the same name. He had a nephew named Hiyya, who was known for his pleasant voice.

Teachings
He is cited infrequently in the Mishnah, but more often in the Talmud and works of midrash, on both halachic and aggadic topics.

In Derech Eretz Zutta he teaches a long list of ethical rules.

Quotes

 Jealousy, lust, and ambition put a man out of the world.
 The synagogues and study halls in Babylonia will in the time to come be planted in the Land of Israel.
 Great is peace, for all blessings conclude with peace.
 When wine (whose gematria is 70) enters, a secret (whose gematria is also 70) comes out.

Archaeological finding

In a mosque in "Kfar Devora" (central Golan Heights), a door-lintel was discovered decorated with two birds of prey, holding nosegay in their beaks. The lintel bears the inscription:

This is the only archaeological finding from the era of the Tannaim in which the term "beit midrash" appears. The lintel is exhibited at the Golan Archaeological Museum in Katzrin.

Eleazar himself is noted for a saying in praise of humility, which uses as a metaphor the lintel and other parts of a door:

References 

 Its bibliography:
 Bacher, Ag. Tan. ii. 500;
 Heilprin, Seder ha-Dorot, ii., s.v.;
 C. Taylor, Sayings of the Jewish Fathers, 2d ed., pp. 76 et seq.

Mishnah rabbis
2nd-century rabbis
Pirkei Avot rabbis